Diphenylprolinol (D2PM), or (R/S)-(±)-diphenyl-2-pyrrolidinyl-methanol, is a norepinephrine-dopamine reuptake inhibitor which is used as a designer drug.

Pharmacology
The dextrorotary (R)-(+)-enantiomer is the more pharmacologically active, although a variety of related derivatives have been studied.

Side effects including chest pain (suggestive of possible cardiovascular toxicity) have been seen following recreational use of diphenylprolinol, although it was combined with glaucine in a party pill product, thus making it impossible to say for certain which drug was responsible.

Other uses 
Diphenylprolinol can be used to prepare the chiral CBS catalyst, which is used for enantioselective organic synthesis.

See also
 2-Diphenylmethylpyrrolidine (Desoxy-diphenylprolinol)
 Desoxypipradrol
 Pipradrol
 Prolinol
 Corey-Bakshi-Shibata reduction

References

Tertiary alcohols
Stimulants
Norepinephrine–dopamine reuptake inhibitors
Phenylethanolamines
Pyrrolidines
Designer drugs
Benzhydryl compounds